The Fort Bragg and Southeastern Railroad was formed by Atchison, Topeka and Santa Fe Railway as a consolidation of logging railways extending inland from Albion, California on the coast of Mendocino County. The railroad and its predecessors operated from August 1, 1885 to January 16, 1930. The line was merged into the regional Northwestern Pacific Railroad in 1907; but planned physical connection was never completed.

History
Captain William A. Richardson built a sawmill at the mouth of the Albion River in 1853. This logging operation incorporated the Albion River Railroad Company on September 24, 1885 to haul logs down the Albion River to the sawmill. The railroad extended  to Keene's summit when it was reorganized with the sawmill on May 26, 1891 as the Albion Lumber Company with headquarters in San Francisco. Lumber was loaded onto ships from a wharf at the mouth for the Albion River for drying and planing in San Francisco.

H. B. Tichnor and Company built a sawmill at the mouth of the Navarro River in 1861. This logging operation was reorganized as the Navarro Mill Company in 1886 and loaded lumber onto ships from a millside wharf. Navarro Mill Company had extended a logging railroad  up the Navarro River by the time the sawmill burned in 1902. The focus of logging operations in the Navarro River watershed then shifted to the community of Wendling, near the upstream extent of the Navarro Mill Company railway.

The Albion and Southeastern Railroad was formed on April 1, 1902 to purchase the railway from the Albion Lumber Company and extend it into the Anderson Valley of the Navarro River to Boonville, California. The Santa Fe Railway incorporated the Fort Bragg and Southeastern Railroad on March 25, 1903 with intention to extend the Albion and Southeastern through the Dry Creek drainage for a connection with national railway system at Healdsburg, California. The Fort Bragg and Southeastern completed construction from Keene's Summit to Wendling on September 15, 1905. Switchbacks were required near Keene's Summit. A. G. Stearns built a sawmill in Wendling in 1905. The Wendling sawmill was reorganized as the Navarro Lumber Company in 1914. The community of Wendling was renamed Navarro as the local population shifted from the old coastal community of Navarro (which changed its name to Navarro-by-the-sea) to follow the logging and milling jobs.

The Fort Bragg and Southeastern was included in the Northwestern Pacific Railroad merger on January 8, 1907. Southern Pacific Transportation Company purchased the Albion Lumber Company in 1907 to manufacture ties and bridge timbers for railway construction in Mexico. The Albion Lumber Company purchased the Navarro Lumber Company in May 1920. The Fort Bragg and Southeastern was extended  past Wendling to a point known as Christine, and a branch line extended one mile up the Albion River from Clearbrook Junction. Albion Lumber Company trackage extended the Clearbrook branch  toward Comptche, California and Navarro Lumber Company trackage extended  past Christine. There were numerous shorter logging branches owned by the lumber companies, but trains never reached Boonville or Healdsburg. Operation of the Navarro sawmill ended in September 1927; and the last log went through the Albion sawmill on May 19, 1928. The railroad ceased operation on January 16, 1930 and was dismantled for scrap in 1937.

Route
 Milepost 0 - Albion wharf (2-stall Roundhouse built 1891 and dismantled in 1937)
 Milepost 3.25 - Brett
 Milepost 7.32 - Clearbrook Junction
 Milepost 8.30 - Gunari
 Milepost 12.37 - Sunny Slope
 Milepost 13.05 - Skibo (water tank)
 Milepost 14.65 - switchback
 Milepost 15.44 - Keene summit elevation 
 Milepost 15.65 - switchback
 Milepost 16.54 - Dunn (water tank)
 Milepost 22.15 - Stearn's sawmill
 Milepost 22.87 - Wendling (1-stall Roundhouse built 1905 and dismantled in 1937)
 Milepost 25.65 - Christine

Locomotives
The first Albion River Railroad steam locomotive was Baldwin 2-4-2T No. 1 'Albion'. Later a Porter, a Hinkley, two other Baldwins, two Limas and a Ford Model T with a Martin-Parry freight and jitney body were used.

Photographs

Notes

 

Rail transportation in California
Logging railroads in the United States
Transportation in Mendocino County, California
Defunct California railroads
History of Mendocino County, California
Railways with Zig Zags
Railway lines closed in 1930